Peter Bloch (15 July 1923 – 27 June 1976) was a Norwegian track and field athlete. He was born in Kristiania, and represented the sports club IF Ready. He competed in 100 m and 200 m sprint at the 1948 Summer Olympics in London.

Competition record

References

External links

1923 births
1976 deaths
Athletes from Oslo
Athletes (track and field) at the 1948 Summer Olympics
Olympic athletes of Norway